Prasophyllum tortilis is a species of orchid endemic to South Australia. It has a single tube-shaped leaf and up to ten purplish-brown and green flowers with a purple labellum. It is a recently described plant, previously included with P. fitzgeraldii, but distinguished from that species by its smaller number of smaller, more darkly coloured, short-lived flowers. It also resembles P. goldsackii but has fleshier flowers than that species.

Description
As with others in the genus, the flowers are inverted so that the labellum is above the column rather than below it. The edges of the upturned part are wavy or crinkled with short, hair-like papillae. There is a raised, greenish-yellow callus in the centre of the labellum and extending almost to its tip. Flowering occurs from late September to mid-October.

Taxonomy and naming
Prasophyllum tortilis was first formally described in 2017 by David Jones and Robert Bates and the description was published in Australian Orchid Review from a specimen collected in the Wanilla Conservation Park. The specific epithet (tortilis) is a Latin word meaning "twisted", referring to the fleshy texture of this orchid.

Distribution and habitat
This leek orchid mostly grows in hilly woodland between the Eyre Peninsula and southern Mount Lofty Ranges

References

External links 
 

tortilis
Flora of South Australia
Plants described in 2017
Endemic orchids of Australia